Jordan Brian Henderson  (born 17 June 1990) is an English professional footballer who plays as a midfielder for  club Liverpool and the England national team. Henderson is noted for his leadership and technical ability.

Henderson joined the Sunderland Academy at the age of eight, making his first-team debut a decade later in November 2008. He spent six months on loan at Coventry City in 2009, before returning to Sunderland. In 2011, Henderson signed for Liverpool, winning his first trophy with the club, the League Cup, one year later. Appointed Liverpool captain in 2015, Henderson won the UEFA Champions League, the UEFA Super Cup and the FIFA Club World Cup in 2019, and in 2020 led his team to the Premier League title, the club's first league title in 30 years. For his performances in the title-winning season, Henderson was named FWA Footballer of the Year. In 2022, Henderson lifted the FA Cup and the EFL Cup, where Liverpool defeated Chelsea on penalties.

An England international, Henderson has over 70 appearances for his country since his debut in 2010. He has appeared at six international tournaments with England, the 2012, 2016 and 2020 UEFA European Championships and the 2014, 2018 and 2022 FIFA World Cups. He was the first player to win the England Player of the Year award at both the U-21 and senior level.

Club career

Sunderland
Henderson was born in Sunderland, Tyne and Wear, and joined the youth system of his hometown club Sunderland aged eight. He signed a professional contract with the club on 1 July 2008. He made his league debut on 1 November 2008 in a 5–0 away defeat to Chelsea coming on as a half-time substitute. He then made his first Sunderland start and home debut against Blackburn Rovers in the League Cup the following month.

Coventry City (loan)
In January 2009, Henderson joined Championship club Coventry City on a one-month loan deal. He made his Coventry debut in a 2–1 defeat to Derby County. Henderson's loan to Coventry was extended until the end of the season, and he scored the first senior goal of his career on 28 February 2009 against Norwich City. After picking up an injury, a fracture to the fifth metatarsal bone in his foot, he returned to Sunderland in April 2009.

Return to Sunderland

In the 2009–10 season, Henderson broke into the Sunderland first team and made 38 appearances, scoring 2 goals. He scored his first senior goal for the club against Birmingham City in the League Cup third round. He then went on to score his first Premier League goal against Manchester City on 19 December 2009.

Henderson spent the majority of the season on the right side of midfield but played centrally in the absence of Lee Cattermole; his versatility and consistency earned him a new five-year contract on 23 April 2010, keeping him with the club until 2015. He also went on to win the Sunderland Young Player of the Year award for the 2009–10 season.

Henderson was a major part of the team during the 2010–11 season making 39 appearances and scoring 3 goals, including his first league double, on 23 April at home to Wigan Athletic. On 13 January 2011, Henderson was listed on the official FIFA website as one of 13 young players to watch in 2011. He was named Sunderland's Young Player of the Year for the second season running.

Liverpool

2011–2015: Breaking into the first team

On 9 June 2011, Henderson was transferred to Liverpool for an undisclosed fee thought to be between £16 and £20 million. He made his debut in Liverpool's first match of the 2011–12 Premier League, a 1–1 draw against his former club Sunderland where he was given a mixed reception by Sunderland fans. On 27 August 2011, Henderson scored his first goal for Liverpool in a Premier League fixture at Anfield against Bolton Wanderers. On 26 February 2012, Henderson started on the right of midfield in Liverpool's 2012 League Cup Final victory over Cardiff City before being substituted in the 58th minute. On 5 May, he played the full 90 minutes as Liverpool were beaten 2–1 by Chelsea in the 2012 FA Cup Final. Henderson ended the 2011–12 season with 2 goals from 48 appearances.

In August 2012, Henderson was told he could be signed by Fulham by new manager Brendan Rodgers, but this was rejected by the player. He went on to score his first European goal for Liverpool on 6 December 2012, with the winner against Udinese in the UEFA Europa League as the Reds qualified for the last 32.

Henderson established himself as a regular member of the Liverpool team in the 2013–14 season, playing in 40 matches and scoring 5 goals. On 29 September 2013, he made his 100th appearance for the club as Liverpool won 1–3 at Sunderland.

On 13 April 2014 he received his first career red card for a dangerous sliding tackle on Samir Nasri in a 3–2 win over Manchester City, resulting in a three match ban which meant he would miss three of Liverpool's last four matches; without Henderson, Liverpool lost 0–2 in a home game against Chelsea and drew 3–3 with Crystal Palace, losing a 3–0 lead in just 15 minutes before the final whistle. Failure to win 3 points in each of those games meant Liverpool had already been overhauled by Manchester City in first place by the time of Henderson's return from suspension. On 11 May 2014, the final match day of the competition, he started in Liverpool's 2–1 home win over Newcastle United only to finish second as Manchester City claimed the league title in their concurrent game.

Henderson started the 2014–15 season in a good form, providing two assists in Liverpool's first three league matches, and was named as the club's vice-captain following the departure of Daniel Agger. On 29 November, Henderson started as captain for the first time for Liverpool in the Premier League against Stoke City as Steven Gerrard was an unused substitute. On 2 December, Henderson marked his 150th appearance for the club by scoring the third goal in a 3–1 win against Leicester City to confirm the win. Henderson started many Liverpool matches as captain as Gerrard was out injured or being rested on the bench. On 23 April, Henderson signed a five-year contract extension at Liverpool worth £100,000 a week.

2015–present: Club captain and European and Premier League success

Following the departure of Gerrard in June 2015, Henderson was made captain of Liverpool. After aggravating a heel injury Henderson underwent surgery, but broke a bone in his right foot before he could rejoin the starting line-up. It was reported that Henderson's heel problems stemmed from the incurable condition plantar fasciitis.
The injury meant that he missed the arrival of manager Jürgen Klopp after Rodgers was sacked.

He returned to first-team football on 29 November 2015 against Swansea City. He scored on his first start since his injury, in a 2–2 home draw with West Bromwich Albion on 13 December 2015. A knee injury sustained during Liverpool's Europa League first leg clash with Borussia Dortmund ruled him out until the end of the season. Henderson ended the 2015–16 season with 26 appearances and 2 goals.

Henderson started the 2016–17 season with regular appearances in the starting eleven and on 16 September scored a spectacular 25-yard strike in a 2–1 win over Chelsea at Stamford Bridge. The strike earned him the Premier League Goal of the Month award for the month of September. Henderson ended the season with 27 appearances, scoring 1 goal.

Henderson spent the 2017–18 season as a first-team regular, on 23 September 2017 he scored his only goal of the season, a winner against Leicester City in a 3–2 win. On 15 August 2017 Henderson captained Liverpool for the first time in the Champions League against German side Hoffenheim. He would go on to captain Liverpool all the way to the final, ending up on the losing side after Liverpool were beaten 3–1 by Real Madrid in Kyiv. Henderson ended the 2017–18 season with 41 appearances in all competitions, scoring 1 goal.

Henderson signed a new five-year deal at Liverpool in 2018 after leading the club to its first UEFA Champions League final in over a decade. After signing the contract, Henderson emphasised his intentions to remain at Liverpool for as long as possible and ideally the remainder of his career. On 24 November, Henderson was sent off after receiving a second yellow card in a 3–0 win against Watford, meaning he would miss the Merseyside derby on 2 December.

On 7 May 2019, Henderson played through pain after suffering a first half knee injury to captain Liverpool to qualification for their second UEFA Champions League final in as many seasons with a 4–3 aggregate semi-final victory over Barcelona, a 4–0 victory on the night. Liverpool began the match with a 0–3 deficit to overcome and key players missing, and the comeback is considered to be one of the best in the history of the competition.

On 1 June 2019, Henderson captained Liverpool in a 2–0 victory over Tottenham Hotspur in the 2019 UEFA Champions League Final in Madrid, becoming the fifth Liverpool captain to lift the Champions League trophy, the club's sixth overall. Liverpool then followed this up by winning the 2019 UEFA Super Cup, beating Chelsea on penalties.

On 21 December 2019, Henderson led Liverpool to their first FIFA Club World Cup title after defeating 2019 Copa Libertadores winners Flamengo 1–0 at extra time in the final in Doha, making them the only English club to win the treble of continental trophies. After this third trophy in a year, ex-Liverpool player John Aldridge voiced his belief that Henderson should now be regarded as a Liverpool great.

Liverpool finished the 2018–19 season with one of the highest points totals in English top-flight history, but finished in 2nd place one point behind champions Manchester City. Liverpool's good form continued into the following season, and after a break caused by the COVID-19 pandemic, Henderson led Liverpool to their first league title in 30 years on 25 June 2020. Often credited for heroic and passionate performances throughout the league-winning season, Henderson was named the FWA Footballer of the Year for 2020 along with being named a finalist for the PFA Player of the Year. Having featured in 40 games during the 2019–20 season, Henderson entered the list of top 40 all-time Liverpool appearance makers at the end of the campaign.

On 15 September 2021, Henderson scored his first Champions League goal in seven years, the winner claiming all three points of the opening group stage match in the 3–2 home victory over AC Milan. On 24 October, he captained Liverpool to a 5–0 victory against Manchester United at Old Trafford, with his defence splitting pass putting Mohamed Salah through to score Liverpool's fifth. Henderson made his 300th Premier League appearance for Liverpool on 8 November against West Ham United.

On 14 May 2022, Henderson became the first Liverpool captain to win 6 different trophies after winning the 2021–22 FA Cup.

International career

Youth
Henderson made his debut for the under-19s against the Czech Republic in 2009, before breaking into Stuart Pearce's under-21 squad. He scored his first goal in an England shirt in the European U21 Championship play-offs against Romania, hitting a volley from outside the box to give England the lead.

Henderson was selected in the England U21 squad for the 2011 European Championship. However, England were knocked out in the group stage. He captained the England U21 team in a 6–0 win over Azerbaijan U21 on 1 September 2011, scoring one goal in the Euro 2013 qualifier. He then scored his fourth under-21 goal in a 2–1 win away at Norway, maintaining England's 100% record in Euro 2013 qualification. On 3 February 2013, Henderson was named the England U21 Player of the Year in the inaugural year of the award. He captained the under-21 team at the 2013 UEFA European Under-21 Championship.

Senior

On 11 November 2010, Henderson was omitted from England's U21 squad for their friendly with Germany, instead receiving his first call up to the senior England squad on 17 November 2010 for their friendly against France. He made his debut in the match, playing from the start in central midfield alongside Steven Gerrard.

Initially named as a standby player, Henderson was called up to the England Euro 2012 squad to replace the injured Frank Lampard. He featured in England's first match of the tournament against France, coming on as a substitute in the 78th minute for Scott Parker, and again featured as a substitute, coming on during extra-time, in England's quarter-final penalty shoot-out defeat to Italy.

Henderson was selected in Roy Hodgson's 23-man squad to travel to Brazil for the 2014 FIFA World Cup. He started in England's opening two World Cup group matches, 2–1 defeats to Italy in Manaus, and Uruguay in São Paulo.

Henderson was also selected in the England Euro 2016 squad by Roy Hodgson. He only played one match, playing the full 90 minutes in the final group match against Slovakia which ended 0–0 as England finished second in their group.

He was named in the 23-man England national team squad for the 2018 FIFA World Cup. In England's Round of 16 match against Colombia, Henderson was the only Three Lions player to miss a spot-kick as the match went to penalties. England still won though, 4–3, and made it to the semi-finals. The following year, after helping his nation finish third at the inaugural UEFA Nations League and qualify for UEFA Euro 2020, Henderson was named England Player of the Year, in the process becoming the first player to win the award at both U21 and senior level.

Henderson's first international goal came on 3 July 2021 in the Euro 2020 quarter-final game against Ukraine. Entering as a substitute, he scored England's last goal with a header of the 4–0 win. In the UEFA Euro 2020 Final, Henderson was a 74th minute substitute before being replaced himself by Marcus Rashford at the end of extra time as England finished as runners-up.

Henderson was named in the English 26-man squad for the 2022 FIFA World Cup. He scored his first ever World Cup goal after a link-up play with Jude Bellingham in the Round of 16 against Senegal.

Player profile

Style of play 

Henderson usually plays as a box-to-box midfielder, although under Klopp he has mostly been used as a defensive midfielder. However, with the arrival of Fabinho in 2018, Henderson moved back to his original "number 8" position as a central midfielder closer to the right side of the pitch, a role in which he excels the most. A versatile player, he has also been used in a more advanced midfield role on occasion, and even as a makeshift centre-back during periods of injury crisis among Liverpool's central defenders. He is widely regarded as a player who works hard and brings energy to the team.

Described as an "athletic and hardworking midfielder," Henderson has developed his game during his time at Liverpool, evolving into a more complete player; in particular, former Liverpool player Danny Murphy noted that his passing range had increased, which allowed him to take on an increasingly more creative role for his team. Furthermore, he constantly presses high up the field whenever the opposition is in possession. Besides physical attributes and footballing skills, he has also been praised for his tactical intelligence, consistency, and his leadership both on and off the pitch. He is also known for his ability to win challenges, transition the ball forward, and make attacking runs from midfield to get into good offensive positions.

Henderson has the most passes of any player in Premier League history, with 22,340.

Reception 
Although he received media criticism early in his career for being dispensable, he later drew praise from pundits for his ability to develop his game and establish himself as an essential player, with Flamengo manager Jorge Jesus describing him as the "best midfielder in the world in his position" following their encounter in the 2019 FIFA Club World Cup Final. Liverpool coach Klopp described him as "exceptional" and "outstanding," while Steven Gerrard said about Henderson, "Teams can't function at Liverpool's level without a cog like Jordan Henderson."

Personal life
Henderson studied at Farringdon Community Sports College before joining Sunderland as a youngster. He is a Sunderland fan and attended the 2014 League Cup Final with the Sunderland fans, while being a player at Liverpool. On the same day as being named Liverpool captain, it was announced he would also be featuring alongside Lionel Messi on the cover of the UK edition of FIFA 16.

Henderson and his wife Rebecca Burnett have three children. His father Brian, a former policeman and amateur footballer, survived oral cancer during Henderson's early Liverpool career and was able to attend the 2019 Champions League final in Madrid.

In December 2020, Henderson responded on Twitter to a fan who said that the club had helped deal with his sexual orientation during his teenage years and early adulthood. Henderson stated that if by wearing rainbow laces as Premier League captains helped at least one person, it was progress. He further stated that "everyone is welcome at Liverpool Football Club", sparking positive reactions from fans and LGBT organisations. Kop Outs, the official LGBT Liverpool supporters group said of Henderson's response as "an immensely important moment which touched a chord with all Reds fans."

During the COVID-19 pandemic in the United Kingdom, Henderson, as captain of Liverpool, contacted fellow Premier League captains to organise a COVID-19 fund that would raise millions of pounds for the NHS. His idea was for Premier League footballers to contribute to a fund for frontline NHS workers. 

Henderson was appointed a Member of the Order of the British Empire (MBE) in the 2021 Birthday Honours for "services to Football and to Charity particularly during the Covid-19 Pandemic".

His autobiography, Jordan Henderson: The Autobiography, was released in October 2022.

Career statistics

Club

International

England score listed first, score column indicates score after each Henderson goal

Honours
Liverpool
Premier League: 2019–20
FA Cup: 2021–22; runner-up: 2011–12
Football League Cup/EFL Cup: 2011–12, 2021–22; runner-up: 2015–16
FA Community Shield: 2022
UEFA Champions League: 2018–19; runner-up: 2017–18, 2021–22
UEFA Super Cup: 2019
FIFA Club World Cup: 2019
UEFA Europa League runner-up: 2015–16

England
UEFA European Championship runner-up: 2020
UEFA Nations League third place: 2018–19

Individual
England U21 Player of the Year Award: 2012
Liverpool Young Player of the Year: 2011–12
Sunderland Young Player of the Year: 2009–10, 2010–11
Premier League Goal of the Month: September 2016
England Senior Men's Player of the Year: 2019
FWA Footballer of the Year: 2019–20
Liverpool Fans' Player of the Season Award: 2019–20
PFA Team of the Year: 2019–20 Premier League
ESM Team of the Year: 2019–20

Orders
Member of the Order of the British Empire: 2021

References

External links

Profile at the Liverpool F.C. website
Profile at the Football Association website

1990 births
Living people
Footballers from Sunderland
English footballers
Association football midfielders
Sunderland A.F.C. players
Coventry City F.C. players
Liverpool F.C. players
Premier League players
English Football League players
FA Cup Final players
UEFA Champions League winning players
England youth international footballers
England under-21 international footballers
England international footballers
UEFA Euro 2012 players
2014 FIFA World Cup players
UEFA Euro 2016 players
2018 FIFA World Cup players
UEFA Euro 2020 players
2022 FIFA World Cup players
English autobiographers
Members of the Order of the British Empire